Prasanna (born 10 February 1951), is a major Indian theatre director and playwright from Karnataka. He is one of the pioneers of modern Kannada theatre. He graduated from the National School of Drama (NSD). He founded Samudaya and gave a creative direction to Kannada theatre in the 1970s with other activists. Prasanna lives in Heggodu in Karnataka. He is known for his organisational skills and new ideas and innovations in theatre. He is a Sangeet Natak Akademi Awardee. He has directed plays for National School of Drama (Repertory Company, NSD), Ninasam, Rangamandal-Bhopal, Rangayana and worked with many theatre organizations of India.

Early life 
Prasanna quit IIT to pursue his passion in theatre. He was Inspired into theatre by B.V. Karanth, Prasanna joined the National School Drama (NSD). During the Emergency, he went back to Karnataka and founded Samudaya, a radical theatre movement for workers and masses. He staged street plays, protest plays and propagated their political thought in villages. For a while he was also a visiting faculty at NSD. For a couple of years, he worked for an independent television company in New Delhi. He gave this up and left the capital. That was a phase when Prasanna was disenchanted with theatre and almost gave up on his passion, a man who created well noted stage productions like Tughlaq, Gandhi, etc.

Direction
Girish Karnad's Tughlaq, Gandhi, Life of Galileo, Thai (Brecht's Mother Courage and Her Children), Acharya Tartuf, Lal Ghas Per Neele Ghode (translation -Uday Prakash), Ek Lok Katha, Shakuntalam (Abhijñānaśākuntalam), Fujiyama, Dangeya Munchina Dinagalu, Kadadida Neeru, Uttar Ram Charit, Cupid's Broken Arrow, William Shakespeare's Hamlet, Seema Paar(Play on Bharatendu Harishchandra) etc.

Playwright
He is also a Kannada playwright, Novelist, and poet. Some of his dramas are:Uli, Seema Paar, Dangeya Munchina Dinagalu, Ondu Lokada Kathe, Haddu Meerida Haadi, Mahihmapura, Jangamada Badaku.

Books about acting 
Indian Method in Acting

Work for visual media

Docu-film "Gokak" (V. K. Gokak) for Sahitya Akademi, Delhi
Creative Director- Taana -Bana (1991), TV Serial produced by Press Trust of India (PTI-TV)
Worked with ITV

Awards
B V Karanth award, 2007, National School of Drama
Sangeet Natak Akademi Award, for Direction, 1999–2000

References

External links
National theatre needs to be redined: Prasanna
Essay Saffron curtain ;Tehelka.com
If people play their part by Priya Kanungo
Theatre At The Grass Roots: K.V. Subbanna In Dialogue With Prasanna And Geeti Sen
Let the colours be ;The Hindu
Centre concedes Prasanna's demand ;The Hindu

Indian theatre directors
Recipients of the Sangeet Natak Akademi Award
National School of Drama alumni
Indian male dramatists and playwrights
Kannada people
Kannada-language writers
Living people
People from Shimoga district
1951 births
Dramatists and playwrights from Karnataka
20th-century Indian dramatists and playwrights
20th-century Indian male writers
Recipients of the Rajyotsava Award 2004